Maizie is a 1933 American drama film directed by Dallas M. Fitzgerald and starring Dorothy Lee, Lee Moran and John Darrow. It was shot at studios in Fort Lee in New Jersey.

Cast
 Dorothy Lee as Mazie 
 Lee Moran as Mike McCann 
 Katharine Ellis as Edith Stone 
 John Darrow as Boyd Kenton 
 LeRoy Mason as Paul Barnes 
 Walter Miller as Jason Steele 
 William H. Strauss as Mr. Webber 
 Connie Elliott as Irene Murphy 
 Gladden James as Crook 
 Henry Hall as Customer

References

Bibliography
 Jamie Brotherton & Ted Okuda. Dorothy Lee: The Life and Films of the Wheeler and Woolsey Girl. McFarland, 2013.

External links
 

1933 films
1933 drama films
American drama films
Films directed by Dallas M. Fitzgerald
American black-and-white films
Films shot in Fort Lee, New Jersey
1930s English-language films
1930s American films